Abitar (also Romanized as Ābītar) is a village in Seyyed Abbas Rural District, Shavur District, Shush County, Khuzestan Province, Iran. At the 2006 census, its population was 1,325, in 182 families.

References 

Populated places in Shush County